The 2020 Hungarian Athletics Championships were the 125th edition of the Hungarian Athletics Championships, which took place on 8–9 August 2020 at the Lantos Mihály Sportközpont in Budapest.

Results

Men

Women

References

External links
Official website of the Hungarian Athletics Association

Hungarian Athletics Championships
Hungarian Athletics Championships
Athletics Championships
Sports competitions in Budapest
August 2020 sports events in Hungary